Antonio Ocampo Mabesa (January 27, 1935  – October 4, 2019), known as Tony Mabesa, was a Filipino stage director, film and television actor, and professor. With a career spanning over 70 years, he was a founding father of Philippine university theater and one of the most prominent theater directors in the country. For his work, he was known as a "Lion of the Theater".

He founded the theater groups Dulaang UP and the UP Playwrights' Theatre.

Early life and education 
Mabesa was born in Los Baños, Laguna. He entered high school at the University of the Philippines Rural High School, where he first directed a school production. He finished his degree in Agriculture at the University of the Philippines Los Baños, where he was mentored by Wilfrido Ma. Guerrero. He was a member of the Upsilon Sigma Phi. 

He pursued a master's degree in theater arts at the University of California, Los Angeles (UCLA) in 1965, and a master's degree in education at the University of Delaware in 1969. He took further studies in dramatic literature at the University of Minnesota. While in the US, worked as a stage manager to Sir Tyrone Guthrie, where he "observed up close how a campus-based theater organization should be run and could work."

Career 
Upon his return from studies abroad, Mabesa was offered a teaching position at the UP Diliman’s Department of Speech Communications and Theater Arts. As an educator, Mabesa pushed for the establishment of a Baccalaureate program devoted to Theater Arts, which began in 1978, and a Master of Arts in Theater Arts Program at the UP Diliman Campus.

He founded the theater groups Dulaang UP (DUP) in 1976, the UP Playwright’s Theater in 1980, and later on founded the Angeles University Foundation Reportory Theater in 2005. In 1978, he served as Theater Director of the Manila Metropolitan Theater.

Over the course of his career, he directed and produced over 170 productions. He mentored some of the country's most prominent theater artists, such as Shamaine Centenera, Irma Adlawan, Nonie Buencamino, Eugene Domingo, Frances Makil-Ignacio, and Neil Ryan Sese.

Death 
Mabesa died on October 4, 2019, aged 84, in Manila.

Filmography

Film 

 Macho Dancer (1988)
 Tukso Layuan Mo Ako! (1991)
 Closer to Home (1995)
 Kristo (1996)
 Jose Rizal (1998)
 Azucena (2000)
 Mano Po (2002–2008)
 The Mistress (2012)
 El Presidente (2012)
 She's the One (2013)
 Maybe This Time (2014)
 Felix Manalo (2015)
 Rainbow's Sunset (2018)
 Clarita (2019)

 Television 

 Villa Quintana (1995–1997) 
 Vietnam Rose (2005)
 Pasan Ko ang Daigdig (2007)
 Babangon Ako't Dudurugin Kita (2008)
 Una Kang Naging Akin (2008)
 May Bukas Pa (2009)
 Basahang Ginto (2010)
 Enchanted Garden (2012)
 My Little Juan (2013)
 Maalaala Mo Kaya (2014)
 The Rich Man's Daughter (2015)
 FPJ's Ang Probinsyano (2015)
 Hiram na Anak (2019)

Awards and legacy

Awards 

 Best Supporting Actor, 2018 Metro Manila Film Festival: Rainbow's Sunset (2018)
 Gawad CCP Para sa Sining awardee for Theater (2015) 
 Upsilonian, Noble and Outstanding (UNO) Award
 Order of National Artists of the Philippines (2022)

References 

1935 births
2019 deaths
Filipino theatre directors
Filipino dramatists and playwrights
Filipino male film actors
Male actors from Laguna (province)
Filipino artists
Filipino male television actors
21st-century Filipino male actors
GMA Network personalities
ABS-CBN personalities
TV5 (Philippine TV network) personalities